Shram Sadhana Trust is a trust promoted by Pratibha Patil, who later became President of India. Currently Jyoti Rathore the daughter of Pratibha Patil is the managing trustee of the trust.
The Trust controls four major working women's hostels and also a college of engineering and technology at Bambhori in Jalgaon district. Two of these four hostels are located in Mumbai, one each in Delhi and Pimpri near Pune.

The hostel at Pimpri named Umanchal Hostel was inaugurated by Pratibha Patil then governor of Rajasthan in January 2005. The Union Ministry for Women and Child Development sanctioned Rs 96 lakh for its construction. The Maharashtra Government gifted Rs 1 crore worth of land to the Shram Sadhana Trust for the hostel.

The hostel at Mumbai was set up in 1974 with financial help from the government when Pratibha Patil was a cabinet minister in Government of Maharashtra.

In Delhi, the trust runs the Shubhanchal working women's hostel

The Central government's rule that government finance is to be given only to the hostels with capacity of less 100 inmates was waived for all four hostels run by the Trust.

External links 

Non-profit organisations based in India
Pratibha Patil
Corruption in Maharashtra